The Lawn is a historic home and national historic district located near Nokesville, Prince William County, Virginia. The main house was built in 1926 to replace the original Gothic Revival style dwelling that burned in a fire in 1921. It is a two-story, three-bay, Tudor Revival style, stuccoed dwelling. The house features half-timber framing and a complex cross gable roof. Attached to the house is a brick kitchen wing that survived from the original house. Also included in the district are a board-and-batten schoolhouse, barn, smokehouse, overseer's cottage, privy, stone dairy, and stone root cellar.

It was added to the National Register of Historic Places in 1989.

References

Houses on the National Register of Historic Places in Virginia
Historic districts on the National Register of Historic Places in Virginia
Gothic Revival architecture in Virginia
Tudor Revival architecture in Virginia
Houses completed in 1850
Houses in Prince William County, Virginia
National Register of Historic Places in Prince William County, Virginia